The Kamchatka shrew  (Sorex camtschatica) is a species of mammal in the family Soricidae. It is endemic to Russia.

Classification
The species was first described in 1972. Before that it was considered a subspecies of cinereus shrew (Sorex cinereus).

Range
Kamchatka shrew inhabits riparian scrubs in North-Eastern Siberia, in the upper reaches of the river Omolon (its tributary Kegan), and in Kamchatka (Kambalny Bay, Lake Azhabachye, neighborhood of Milkovo).

Appearance
The back is ashy-gray, sides are lighter, with brown tones. The belly is light gray. This species is characterized by the highly elongated rear feet with well-defined bristle brush hair.

Life events
Biology of the species is poorly understood. The breeding season lasts from April to September. Females annually produce up to three litters with 5.1 cubs per liter on average.

References

Bibliography

Sorex
Mammals of Russia
Endemic fauna of Russia
Taxonomy articles created by Polbot